Maria Manda Sangma (born 10 May 2003) is a Bangladeshi professional women's footballer who plays as a midfielder for both the Bangladesh Women's Football League club Bashundhara Kings Women and the Bangladesh women's national football team. Previously she played for the Kalsindur High School team in Mymensingh. She was a member of the Bangladesh Under-14 team that won the 2015 AFC U-14 Women's Regional Championship - South and Central in Nepal  and the 2016 AFC U-14 Women's Regional Championship - South and Central in Tajikistan. As a defensive midfield player, she played in the 2017 AFC U-16 Women's Championship qualification which held in Dhaka, Bangladesh under Bangladesh U16.

Early years
Maria Manda Sangma was born on 10 May 2003 in Mandirgona village, Dhobaura, Mymensingh. She belongs to Garo tribe.

Playing career
Maria became involved in football in 2011. In 2013, they became the first champion for the famous Kalsindur Government Primary School in Dhobaura, Maria was a member of that group. Maria Manda was the captain of Bangladesh U-15 team. Under her leadership, Bangladesh became the undefeated champion after defeating India. Maria was called up to the Under-14 national team in 2014. Bangladesh won the AFC U-14 Regional Championship in Tajikistan under her co-captaincy. Maria was also the co-captain of the undefeated champion team in the AFC U-16 qualifiers. Then she took place in the Bangladesh women's national football team. Maria's contribution in becoming the runners-up of SAFF for Bangladesh held in Siliguri is not less. As a result, Bangladesh under-15 armband was tied to her arm in the safe. The whole of Bangladesh saw the next story. Bangladesh is the undefeated champion holding the hand of Maria. In South Asian football, the empire-building India lost twice in the same tournament.

She was selected to the Bangladesh U16 team for the 2015 AFC U-16 Women's Championship qualification – Group B matches in 2014. Bangladesh participated in the AFC U-14 Girls' Regional Championship – South and Central held in Nepal in 2015. Bangladesh women's national U16 football team played the qualifier for the 2017 AFC U-16 Women's Championship. And, she played in 2017 AFC U-16 Women's Championship qualification – Group C matches where Bangladesh became group C champion. Being group C champion, Bangladesh have qualified for the 2017 AFC U-16 Women's Championship in Thailand in September 2017.

She was the member of the Bangladesh U19 team who won the 2018 SAFF U-18 Women's Championship and Bangamata U-19 Women's International Gold Cup in 2019. She later played in the 2019 AFC U-19 Women's Championship qualification.

Maria was selected to Bangladesh women's national football team for 2016 South Asian Games, where they became third in the women's football category and won Bronze. Also she was in the team for 2016 SAFF Women's Championship.Bangladesh were in the Group B. She played two of the group B matches and being group B unbeaten champion, Bangladesh demolish Maldives 6–0 to barge in the semi-final into SAFF Championship final where they lost against India and became Runner-up. And in 2018, she also played in the 2020 AFC Women's Olympic Qualifying Tournament. She played in 2019 SAFF Women's Championship for Bangladesh where they became semi-finalist.

Honours

Club 
Bashundhara Kings Women

 Bangladesh Women's Football League
 Winners (2): 2019–20, 2020–21

International 
SAFF Women's Championship
Winner : 2022
Runner-up : 2016
South Asian Games
Bronze : 2016
SAFF U-18 Women's Championship
Champion (2): 2018, 2021
Bangamata U-19 Women's International Gold Cup
Champion trophy shared (1): 2019
AFC U-14 Girls' Regional C'ship – South and Central
Bangladesh U-14 Girls'
Champion : 2015

References 

2003 births
Living people
Bangladeshi women's footballers
Bangladesh women's international footballers
Bashundhara Kings players
Bangladesh Women's Football League players
Women's association football midfielders
People from Mymensingh District
Bangladeshi Christians
Kalsindur Government Primary School alumni
Garo people
South Asian Games bronze medalists for Bangladesh
South Asian Games medalists in football